Povitroflotskyi Avenue is a street located in Shevchenko Raion and Solomianka Raion of Kyiv. It runs from Viacheslava Chornovola Street to Kyiv International Airport.

History
Povitroflotskyi Avenue appeared in the middle of the 19th century as a road to Zhuliany. Since 1848, the Cadet Highway, from which the building of the Kyiv Cadet Corps (1848-1857) is located at the beginning of the highway and now houses the Ministry of Defense. Then the highway started from Lvivska Street (now Sichovykh Striltsiv Street) and reached the current Ivana Ohienka Street.

References

Streets in Kyiv